Casey Brent Dunn (born October 3, 1976) is an American baseball coach and former catcher, who is the current head baseball coach of the UAB Blazers. He played college baseball at Auburn for coach Hal Baird from 1996 to 1999 and played in Minor League Baseball (MiLB) for 2 seasons from 1999 to 2000. He then served as the head coach of the Samford Bulldogs (2005–2021).

Head coaching record

See also
 List of current NCAA Division I baseball coaches

References

1976 births
Living people
Baseball catchers
Auburn Tigers baseball coaches
Spokane Indians players
Wilmington Blue Rocks players
High school baseball coaches in the United States
Samford Bulldogs baseball coaches
UAB Blazers baseball coaches